Anton Karlsson (born May 20, 1993) is a Swedish professional ice hockey defenceman who is currently playing with KalPa in the Liiga.

Playing career
Karlsson developed as a youth within hometown club, Boro/Vetlanda and later Tingsryds AIF, before securing a move to top flight club, Linköping HC, as a 17-year old in 2010.

Karlsson made his professional Elitserien debut playing with Linköpings HC during the 2012–13 Elitserien season.

In the 2018–19 season, Karlsson posted 4 goals and 13 points in 47 appearances from the blueline for Linköpings. After parts of six seasons with Linköpings HC, he appeared in 247 SHL games registering 12 goals and 40 points before leaving Sweden as a free agent.

On 31 July 2019, Karlsson signed his first North American contract in agreeing to a one-year American Hockey League deal with the Cleveland Monsters, primary affiliate to the Columbus Blue Jackets of the NHL. In his lone season in the AHL in 2019–20, Karlsson made 52 appearances from the blueline posting 2 goals and 11 points before the season was prematurely ended due to the COVID-19 pandemic.

As a free agent, Karlsson opted to return and remain in his native Sweden, agreeing to a one-year contract with HV71 of the SHL, on 15 September 2020.

Career statistics

References

External links

1993 births
Living people
Cleveland Monsters players
HV71 players
KalPa players
Linköping HC players
Mora IK players
Swedish ice hockey defencemen
Vienna Capitals players
HC Vita Hästen players